Ruth Marie Griffith (born 1967) is the John C. Danforth Distinguished Professor in the Humanities at Washington University in St. Louis, and the former John A. Bartlett Professor at Harvard University. Griffith majored in political and social thought as an undergraduate at the University of Virginia before getting her PhD in the study of religion from Harvard University.

References

1967 births
American political scientists
American religion academics
American women political scientists
Christianity studies
Harvard University alumni
Harvard University faculty
Living people
Princeton University faculty
University of Virginia alumni
Washington University in St. Louis faculty